Glaro District is one of 10 districts of River Gee County, Liberia. As of 2008, the population was 4,992.

References

 

Districts of Liberia
River Gee County